() refers to the "carrier" or "vehicle" of the soul, serving as the intermediary between the body and the soul, in Neoplatonism and the philosophical traditions it influenced.

Background 
Neoplatonism is a branch of classical philosophy that uses the works of Plato as a guide to understanding religion and the world. In the Myth of Er, particularly, Plato rendered an account of the afterlife which involved a journey through seven planetary spheres and then eventual reincarnation. He taught that man was composed of mortal body, immortal reason, and an intermediate "spirit". Neoplatonists agreed as to the immortality of the rational soul but disagreed as to whether man's "irrational soul" was immortal and celestial or whether it remained on earth and dissolved after death.

Proclus 
Building on concepts described by Iamblichus and Plotinus, the late Neoplatonist Proclus posited two "carriers" of the soul:

Influence 
The Neoplatonic  was influential to Renaissance occult thought regarding the body of light and 19-century thought regarding the astral body.

See also 
 Aristotle's On the Soul
 Plato's theory of soul

References

Sources

Further reading

Neoplatonism